"Spoon" is a song by krautrock group Can, recorded in 1971. It was originally released as a single with the song "Shikako Maru Ten" on the B-side. "Spoon" also appeared as the final track to the band's album Ege Bamyasi later that year.

The song marked Can's first recorded use of drum machine coupled with live drums, an unusual feature in popular music at the time. The single reached #6 on the German chart in early 1972 due to being the signature theme of the popular German television thriller Das Messer (after Francis Durbridge).  The single sold in excess of 300,000 copies.  Due to the single's success, Can played a free concert at Kölner Sporthalle in Cologne on February 3, 1972.

"Spoon" was featured in Lynne Ramsay's 2004 film adaptation of Morvern Callar. American indie rock band Spoon took their name from this song, and Can themselves used the name for their own record label Spoon Records.

"Spoon" was remixed by both Sonic Youth and System 7 for Can's 1997 remix album, Sacrilege. Elements of Sonic Youth's remix are sampled in Tyler, the Creator's "Foreword" from his 2017 album Flower Boy.

References

1971 songs
Can (band) songs
1972 singles
United Artists Records singles